Feldstein is a Verwaltungsgemeinschaft ("collective municipality") in the district of Hildburghausen, in Thuringia, Germany. The seat of the Verwaltungsgemeinschaft is in Themar.

The Verwaltungsgemeinschaft Feldstein consists of the following municipalities:

References

Verwaltungsgemeinschaften in Thuringia